Nancy Shepherd was a Mayor of the City of Palo Alto, California. She was elected to office by the Palo Alto City Council on 6 January 2014, and replaced by fellow councilwoman Karen Holman on 5 January 2016.

Shepherd was born in San Francisco, California in 1954. She attended college at the San Francisco State University, graduating with a master's degree in international relations. Shepherd was elected to the Palo Alto City Council in 2010, serving as councilwoman until being appointed mayor.

References

1954 births
Living people
San Francisco State University alumni
Mayors of Palo Alto, California
San Francisco Bay Area politicians
Women mayors of places in California
21st-century American women